This is a list of historical and contemporary states and dynasties where Confucianism (including its various sects) was/is the state ideology or exerted/exerts significant politico-cultural influence. Its status could have been shared with other ideologies and/or religions such as Taoism, Buddhism or the Chinese folk religion at some point in time.

Confucianism developed during the Spring and Autumn period of Chinese history from the teachings of the Chinese philosopher Confucius. Confucianism was first adopted as state ideology by the Emperor Wu of Han upon the advice of the statesman Gongsun Hong. Confucianism was later promulgated throughout the Sinosphere.

List of historical Confucian regimes

Note that the dates stated are the corresponding dates for the states/dynasties, not the dates reflecting the adoption of Confucianism as state religion or its widespread influence. Entries are sorted alphabetically.

 Asuka Japan (AD 538–710)
 Azuchi–Momoyama Japan (AD 1568–1600)
 Baekje (18 BC–AD 660)
 Bohai (AD 698–926)
 Cao Wei (AD 220–266)
 Chen dynasty (AD 557–589)
 Eastern Han (Han dynasty) (AD 25–220)
 Eastern Jin (Jin dynasty) (AD 317–420)
 Eastern Wu (AD 222–280)
 Eastern Zhou (Zhou dynasty) (770–256 BC)
 Gaogouli (37 BC–AD 668)
 Goryeo dynasty (AD 918–1392)
 Heian Japan (AD 794–1185)
 Hồ dynasty (AD 1400–1407)
 Jin dynasty (AD 1115–1234)
  Joseon dynasty (AD 1392–1897)
 Kamakura Japan (AD 1185–1333)
  Korean Empire (AD 1897–1910)
 Later Baekje (AD 892–936)
 Later Han (AD 947–951)
 Later Jin (AD 936–947)
 Later Jin (AD 1616–1636)
 Later Zhou (AD 951–960)
 Liang dynasty (AD 502–557)
 Liao dynasty (AD 916–1125)
 Liu Song (AD 420–479)
 Lý dynasty (AD 1009–1225)
 Mạc dynasty (AD 1527–1677)
 Ming dynasty (AD 1368–1644)
 Muromachi Japan (AD 1336–1573)
 Nara Japan (AD 710–794)
 Nguyễn dynasty (AD 1802–1945)
 Nguyễn lords (AD 1558–1777)
 Northern Han (AD 951–979)
 Northern Qi (AD 550–577)
 Northern Song (Song dynasty) (AD 960–1127)
  North Vietnam (AD 1945–1976)
 Northern Wei (AD 386–535)
 Northern Yuan (AD 1368–1635)
 Northern Zhou (AD 557–581)
 Primitive Lê dynasty (Later Lê dynasty) (AD 1428–1527)
  Qing dynasty (AD 1636–1912)
 Revival Lê dynasty (Later Lê dynasty) (AD 1533–1789)
  Ryukyu Kingdom (AD 1429–1879)
 Shu Han (AD 221–263)
 Silla (57 BC–AD 935)
 Southern Ming (AD 1644–1662)
 Southern Qi (AD 479–502)
 Southern Song (Song dynasty) (AD 1127–1279)
  South Vietnam (AD 1955–1975)
 Sui dynasty (AD 581–619)
 Taebong (AD 901–918)
 Tang dynasty (AD 618–690, AD 705–907)
 Tây Sơn dynasty (AD 1778–1802)
 Tokugawa shogunate (AD 1790–1868)
 Trần dynasty (AD 1225–1400)
 Trịnh lords (AD 1545–1787)
 Western Han (Han dynasty) (202 BC–AD 9)
 Western Jin (Jin dynasty) (AD 266–316)
 Western Liao (AD 1124–1218)
 Western Xia (AD 1038–1227)
 Wu Zhou (AD 690–705)
 Xin dynasty (AD 9–23)
 Yuan dynasty (AD 1271–1368)

List of contemporary states with Confucian influence
Entries are sorted alphabetically.

  China, People's Republic of
  China, Republic of
  Japan
  Korea, Democratic People's Republic of
  Korea, Republic of
  Mongolia
  Singapore
  Vietnam

See also
 Confucianism
 Neo-Confucianism
 New Text Confucianism
 New Confucianism
 Taigu school
 Confucius
 Duke Yansheng
 Chinese culture
 East Asian cultural sphere
 Korean Confucianism
 Edo neo-Confucianism
 Dynasties in Chinese history
 Little China (ideology)
 Chinese influence on Japanese culture
 Chinese influence on Korean culture

References

External links
 https://www.encyclopedia.com/environment/encyclopedias-almanacs-transcripts-and-maps/confucianism-korea

States and dynasties
History-related lists
Lists of countries
Lists of dynasties
Cultural regions
East Asian culture
Chinese culture
Japanese culture
Korean culture
Mongolian culture
Vietnamese culture